Senatorial elections were held on June 6, 1922 in the Philippines under the Jones Law provisions. It was controversial when Senate President Manuel L. Quezon accused Sergio Osmeña of using public funds in campaigning which resulted to the Nacionalista Party to be split.

Electoral system 
In a staggered election, the seats of the senators who were first place in 1916 were up for election. The Philippines is divided into 12 senatorial districts, of which all districts save for the 12th district, has one of its seats up. In the 12th district, any vacancy is filled via appointment of the Governor-General. The election itself is via first-past-the-post.

Results

See also
6th Philippine Legislature
Commission on Elections
Politics of the Philippines
Philippine elections

External links
Official website of the Commission on Elections

1922
1922 elections in the Philippines
1922 in the Philippines